André Ferreira may refer to:

 André Ferreira (volleyball) (born 1964), Brazilian former volleyball player
 André Ferreira (footballer, born 1990), Portuguese footballer
 André Ferreira (footballer, born 1996), Portuguese footballer
 André Luís Ferreira (born 1959), former Brazilian footballer